Michael Richard Roach (May 7, 1895 – April 1, 1977) was a Canadian-born  professional ice hockey player who played eight seasons in the National Hockey League for the Toronto St. Pats, Hamilton Tigers and New York Americans. He was born in Glace Bay, Nova Scotia but moved to Boston, Massachusetts during his early life.

Following his retirement from hockey, he joined the Canadian Customs office in Sydney, Nova Scotia. Roach later joined the Glace Bay baseball team, playing in the Cape Breton Professional Baseball League where was a left-handed star at both first and third base. Mickey Roach is an original member of the Nova Scotia Sport Hall of Fame.

Career statistics

Regular season and playoffs

See also
 List of players with five or more goals in an NHL game

References

External links
 
 

1895 births
1977 deaths
Buffalo Bisons (IHL) players
Canadian expatriate ice hockey players in the United States
Canadian ice hockey centres
Hamilton Tigers (ice hockey) players
Ice hockey people from Nova Scotia
New York Americans players
Niagara Falls Cataracts players
Nova Scotia Sport Hall of Fame inductees
People from Glace Bay
Toronto St. Pats players